Coley Park is a suburb of the town of Reading in the English county of Berkshire. It is largely built on the country estate of the same name, surrounding Coley House. It is primarily a residential area, although it is also home to the Berkshire Independent Hospital and has previously been the site of government offices.

Geography
Coley Park is an area of south-west Reading, bounded to the north by the Berkeley Avenue and the older district of Coley, to the south and east by the Holy Brook and the water meadows of the Kennet Valley, and to the west by the Reading to Basingstoke railway line, the now disused Coley branch line and the suburb of Southcote. Besides the water meadows, there are two public open spaces within the suburb, Courage Park and Coley Park Recreation Ground.

Coley Park lies entirely within the borough of Reading, within Coley ward. It is within the Reading West parliamentary constituency. The suburb is split between the Church of England parishes of All Saints Church and St Giles' Church, although neither church is actually within the area.

History

The suburb of Coley Park was built largely on the lands of the Coley Park estate, the history of which is closely linked to that of the Vachell family. John Vachell (1287–1340) was the first member of the family to own land in the area, buying it from Thomas Syward of Reading in 1309. However this land was mostly agricultural, and although the Vachell family were known to have a house in Coley, it is unclear whether this was on the lands later to become Coley Park, or elsewhere in old Coley. The first manor house known to be on the Coley Park estate was known as Vachell House, and was built in around 1555 by Thomas Vachell (1537–1610). This was situated on the banks of the Holy Brook, where Coley Park Farm remains today. It was restored after the English Civil War by Tanfield Vachell (1602–1658).

By 1727 the estate was heavily indebted, and was sold by William Vachell to Colonel Richard Thompson, who had made his money as a merchant in Jamaica before retiring to the UK in 1711. The property passed to Thompson's daughters, Anne and Frances, when he died in 1736, and they sold it to William Chamberlayne in 1792. Chamberlayne's son, also named William, in turn sold the estate to Thomas Bradford in 1802. Bradford resold the property the same year to John McConnell.
 

By this time Vachell House had once again fallen into disrepair, and was subject to seasonal flooding from the Holy Brook. McConnell commissioned a new mansion, Coley House, from the architect Daniel Asher Alexander, well known for his work in London Docks. This house still stands today, and is often referred to as Coley Mansion House or Coley Park House. The old house was demolished, and it is likely that much of its materials were recycled in the new house, which, as built, was of two stories.

In 1810, McConnell sold the estate and house to John Berkeley Monck. Around 1840, John Bligh Monck made some changes to Coley House, including a new staircase and, probably, adding the third floor that is now to be seen. The Monck family would continue to own the estate until 1937, when it was sold to John Bucknell. The Bucknells continued to own the site until the mid-1950s when the estate was sold to a number of purchasers. 

Between 1882 and 1889, Reading Football Club played their games at Coley Park, on the site now known as Coley Park Recreation Ground. This was the clubs first enclosed venue, with previous matches being played on open playing fields.

During the First World War two fields in Coley Park were used as an airfield for the Royal Flying Corps' No 1 School of Military Aeronautics and No.1 School of Technical Training, based nearby. However, flying was disrupted by river fogs and by the end of the war the airfield fell into disuse. Amongst the pilots trained at Coley Park was W. E. Johns, who went on to create the Biggles series of aviation-based adventure stories.

After the Second World War, the Ministry of Agriculture occupied Coley House and the garden areas in the northern part of the estate. Two blocks of offices were built for the ministry in these grounds, the more recent in 1968. Coley House subsequently became semi-derelict.

In 1956 the then Reading Corporation purchased the southern section of Coley Park estate for a future council housing estate. By 1958 new residents were arriving and by 1960 a set of three high-rise 15-storey flats were under construction. By the end of the 1960s a row of five shops, a pub, a church and a school had been built on the Coley Park estate. New roads built at this stage included Wensley Road and Lesford Road.

In 1993 the Berkshire Independent Hospital run by Ramsay Health Care UK was purpose built on a site (part of the ministry site) adjacent to Coley House. This involved constructing a new access road (known as Swallows Croft) parallel to Wensley Road and between that road and Coley House. Subsequently, Coley House itself underwent major restoration works, including the construction of new buildings to the rear and a complete facelift of the roof areas. Today this Grade II Heritage-listed building contains consulting rooms and other outpatient facilities for the hospital.

Two new housing developments on the site of Coley House's former gardens followed around 2000. One, at the end of Swallows Croft, replaced the later of the ministry office blocks. The other, accessed by the new Rembrandt Way, was situated to the north of the hospital. The earlier ministry office was refurbished and reroofed for continued use by Department for Environment, Food and Rural Affairs, but this too eventually succumbed to a further housing development, being closed in 2011 before being demolished and replaced by 71 new homes.

Transport

Coley Park has limited road access, with only two trafficable streets (Shaw Road and St Saviours Road) connecting the suburb's roads to the adjacent Berkeley Avenue, although there are several other access routes available only to pedestrians and/or cyclists. Historically, the estate was served for three decades by the no. 24 bus which connected directly through to Caversham and Emmer Green on the other side of the river Thames. The route was changed to no. 44 in the 1990s and was renumbered to its present-day nominate when the route began to terminate in the town centre. It is connected to Reading town centre by Reading Buses route 11, which operates every 20 minutes during the day, but less frequently in the evening and on Sundays, and takes about 20 minutes.

References

External links

Coley Park and Beyond (local history website)

Country houses in Berkshire
Suburbs of Reading, Berkshire